Ireneusz Socha (born 1964 in Dębica, Poland). Drummer, Composer. Co-editor of DRUT (1985–1987) – one of Poland's first artzines. The mastermind behind Kirkut-Koncept (1986–1990) – a group performing original compositions bordering on rock song, cabaret, ethnic music and experimental. Took part in many other avantgarde Polish groups of the 1980s including: Przestrzenie (art songs), music theatre, Na Przyklad (group improvisation) and Hiena (postindustrial). Collaborates with Jarosław Bester, Bolesław Błaszczyk, Marek Chołoniewski, Chris Cutler, Piotr Czerny, Tomasz Duda, Joane Hétu, Tomasz Krakowiak, Jacek Podsiadło, Raphael Roginski and Yuriy Yaremchuk. Translated into Polish Chris Cutler's File Under Popular (Zielona Sowa Publishing House, 1999). In 2000, founded Dembitzer Music. Between 2004 and 2014, completed translation of the Sefer Dembitz to Polish for JewishGen. Wrote the script and the music for the short documentary titled "Nothing remains forever" (Society of Friends of the Land of Dębica, 2004).

Selected discography 
Najduchy "Lament świętokrzyski" (CD, Requiem Records/Dembitzer Music, 2014)
VA "SLEEP WELL chapter IV - Glad I was young in the 80's" (CD, Requiem Records/Dembitzer Music, 2013)
Ireneusz Socha "Polin" (CD, Mathka/Dembitzer Music, 2012)
KITS "Four Years In Pieces" (CD-R, Dembitzer Music, 2007)
The Cracow Klezmer Band "Balan: Book of Angels Volume 5" (CD, Tzadik, 2006)
Ireneusz Socha "Sztetlach" (CD, Dembitzer Music, 2005)
Chris Cutler "Twice Around The Earth" (CD, ReR, 2005)
VA "Radio Swietlicki" (CD, Lampa i Iskra Boza, 2004)
Najduchy "Porzadek : Chaos" (CD-R, Dembitzer Music, 2003)
Ireneusz Socha/Tomasz Krakowiak "KITS" (CD-R, Dembitzer Music/Dobosz Records, 2002)
VA "City Songs 3" (CD-R, Requiem Records, 2001)
Ireneusz Socha/Barbara Socha/Joane Hétu/Marek Choloniewski/Boleslaw Blaszczyk "With/Without" (CD-R, Dembitzer Music, 2000)
Ireneusz Socha/Piotr Czerny "Microaudioplays" (CD, Soror Mystica, 1998)
Kirkut-Koncept/Na Przyklad/Przestrzenie "Nowe zycie" (MC, OBUH Records, 1996)
Na Przyklad "Jazz zmartwychwstania" (MC, 1991)
Kirkut-Koncept "Kamien na kamieniu" (MC, 1989)
VA "Polish Road" (MC, Organic Tapes, 1989)
VA "Proba orkiestry - FAMA '88" (MC, Radio Szczecin, 1988)
Przestrzenie "Praca kolektywna" (MC, 1988)
Kirkut-Koncept "Kirkut-Koncept" (MC, ARS, 1988)
Kirkut-Koncept "Piknik na kirkucie" (MC, 1987)
Kirkut-Koncept "Piesenki" (MC, Anti-Musik Der Landsh, 1986)

External links 
 Dembitzer Music
 The Cracow Klezmer Band
 Chris Cutler ReR
 Zielona Sowa
 JewishGen

1964 births
Living people
Polish composers
Polish musicians